Glycera dibranchiata, also known as one variant of bloodworm, are segmented, red marine worms that grow up to 14-inches in length and have unique copper teeth made up of a mixture of protein, melanin and 10% copper.  This copper concentration is the highest among any animal.

These creatures live in tidal flats and hunt their prey by burrowing themselves several meters deep into the sand before attempting to ambush anything they are capable of swallowing.

The way these bloodworms grow their partially-metal teeth is through the transformation of a protein from the bottom of the sea into fangs.  The amino acid, referred to as dihydroxyphenylalanine (DOPA), is used to gather copper from the sea floor and then this copper is combined with a protein-rich liquid that is found in ocean water.  Using the copper as a catalyst, the worm turns DOPA into melanin that combines with copper to create the creatures fangs.

Glycera dibranchiata is considered a marine polychaete, and features a prosboscis equipped with four jaws.

References 

Phyllodocida